WMUW (88.5 FM) is a radio station licensed to serve the community of Columbus, Mississippi. The station is owned by Mississippi University for Women, and airs a variety format.

The station was assigned the WMUW call letters by the Federal Communications Commission on January 16, 2006.

History

WMUW went on the air September 28, 1981, at 11 a.m. The station aired a full-service format featuring jazz, big band, and classical music, along with news programming and syndicated fare from the Longhorn Radio Network of the University of Texas at Austin; it broadcast with an effective radiated power of 980 watts. WMUW operated as part of the Division of Communication of the university after a 1982 schoolwide reorganization. By 1984, it was broadcasting 18 hours a day and known among students as "88-Plus". The station's first license, however, expired; according to the June 11, 1998, letter from the Federal Communications Commission, the action came as a result of WMUW's failure to transmit in twelve straight months, which occurred because the station's tower was down. The university immediately applied for a new construction permit, which was awarded in 2005; the license to cover was awarded in 2008.

References

External links
 Official Website
 FCC Public Inspection File for WMUW
 

MUW
Radio stations established in 1981
1981 establishments in Mississippi
Variety radio stations in the United States
MUW
Lowndes County, Mississippi
Mississippi University for Women